Remilly Les Marais (also Rémilly Les Marais) is a commune in the department of Manche, northwestern France. The municipality was established on 1 January 2017 by merger of the former communes of Remilly-sur-Lozon (the seat), Les Champs-de-Losque and Le Mesnil-Vigot.

See also 
Communes of the Manche department

References 

Communes of Manche